Hickory Springs Methodist Episcopal Church is a historic church located along Hickory Springs Road, about  southeast of Chatham, Louisiana.

The church and adjacent Hickory Springs Cemetery were established in 1841. The original church was a log building which served both as a church and as a school. The present church was constructed in 1900. Annual homecomings began in the early 1930s. Regular services ended because of declining local population. Annual homecomings continue being held on the 1st Sunday of October each year.

The church was added to the National Register of Historic Places on May 5, 1989.

See also
National Register of Historic Places listings in Jackson Parish, Louisiana

References

Methodist churches in Louisiana
Churches on the National Register of Historic Places in Louisiana
Churches completed in 1900
Churches in Jackson Parish, Louisiana
National Register of Historic Places in Jackson Parish, Louisiana
1841 establishments in Louisiana